State Trunk Highway 172 (often called Highway 172, STH-172 or WIS 172) is a state highway in the U.S. state of Wisconsin. It is a freeway from Interstate 41 (I-41) / U.S. Highway 41 (US 41) to I-43, providing a southern bypass of Green Bay. West of I-41/US-41, it continues as a surface road past the Green Bay–Austin Straubel International Airport towards Highway 54.

Route description

WIS 172 begins at a junction with WIS 54 in Hobart. From here, the road heads east as a surface road known as Airport Drive. After intersecting County Highway GE at a traffic circle, the highway enters Ashwaubenon, where it passes Green Bay–Austin Straubel International Airport. WIS 172 meets County Highway EB near the airport before becoming a freeway. After junctions with I-41 / US 41 and WIS 32, the route crosses the Fox River and enters Allouez. In Allouez, the freeway intersects WIS 57 before crossing the East River. The route has an exit at County Highway GV (Monroe Drive) before terminating at I-43 in Bellevue.

History
The highway first appeared in 1975 with the completion of the six-lane Fox River span between Ashwaubenon and Allouez.  By 1984, the freeway was extended easterly to its terminus at Interstate 43, which along with US 41 and I-43 completed the circular bypass of Green Bay.  In 1988, STH-172 attained its current length of 11.6 miles after a westerly extension to Oneida at Wisconsin 54.

A large-scale two-year reconstruction project of the Fox River bridge deck and its approaches, costing $37 million, has been completed. The westbound portion opened in 2009 and the eastbound section by August 2010.

Major intersections

See also

References

External links

172
Transportation in Brown County, Wisconsin